Hope Logan is a fictional character from The Bold and the Beautiful, an American soap opera on the CBS network. The character was portrayed by several child actors since Hope's introduction in 2002, most notably Rachel and Amanda Pace. In 2010, the role was rapidly aged and recast with actress Kim Matula, who made her first appearance in January 2010. Matula departed the serial as a series regular in December 2014, but she made guest appearances in 2015 and 2016. As of 2018, the role is portrayed by Annika Noelle.

Introduced in 2002, Hope is the result of an affair between Brooke Logan and Deacon Sharpe, Brooke's ex-son-in-law. Upon Matula's casting, her main storylines revolved around relationships with former love interests Liam and Wyatt Spencer, and rivalry with Steffy Forrester, the latter of which mirrors the rivalry between their mothers, Brooke Logan and Taylor Hayes.

Matula was nominated for the Daytime Emmy Award for Outstanding Younger Actress in a Drama Series in 2014 for her portrayal of Hope. Noelle's portrayal later earned a nomination for the Daytime Emmy Award for Outstanding Supporting Actress in a Drama Series .

Casting 

Between the years of 2002 and 2009, the character was played by child actresses, appearing as a young girl around 5 years old by 2007. On December 4, 2009, it was announced that Hope was to be dramatically aged and portrayed by Kim Matula. Matula signed on as a contract character. Matula began taping The Bold and the Beautiful on November 19, 2009, making her first appearance on January 11, 2010. On November 5, 2014, it was announced that after five years with the series, Matula would be departing the series. Matula taped her final scene on November 6, making her final appearance on December 12. In March 2015, Soap Opera Digest reported news that Matula would make a return to the series, in a guest appearance as Hope.  She is set to report to set on March 4, 2015, she aired on April 17 and 20, 2015. In February 2016, Matula was reported to make a guest return to the soap; she appeared on March 16, 2016.

In November 2017, Soap Opera Digest announced that actress Annika Noelle had been cast in the role of Hope; she made her first appearance on January 8, 2018.

Characterization 
The young adult character of Hope was first described as "A polar opposite of what her mother Brooke once was, Hope makes no secret of her more traditional and reserved views on sex and marriage". Matula has described Hope as "Unlucky in love". Speaking about the character's dramatic aging and her storyline, head writer Bradley Bell stated: "Aging the character of ‘Hope’ to a teenager allows us to bring the next generation of ‘Logans’ to the forefront, as well as play a broader range of the ‘Forrester’ vs. ‘Logan’ story. ‘Hope’s’ presence at Forrester Creations, as well as in ‘Brooke’ and ‘Ridge’s’ home, sparks an intense competition between ‘Hope’ and her step-sister ‘Steffy’ as well as creates new conflict between long-time rivals ‘Brooke’ and ‘Taylor’ as each woman is determined to protect her own daughter."

Storylines

Back story 
Hope was conceived during an affair between Brooke Logan (Katherine Kelly Lang) and Deacon Sharpe (Sean Kanan). At the time, Deacon was married to Hope's half-sister, Bridget Forrester. Hope was born at the Big Bear Cabin and delivered by Stephanie. Deacon signed over his parental rights in 2007 to Ridge Forrester when Hope was taken from Brooke, as she was proven to be an unfit mother by Social Services.  She was reported by Stephanie Forrester (Susan Flannery). Nick Marone (Jack Wagner) was also a father figure for Hope when he was married to Brooke.

2010–2016

After the character was dramatically aged (SORASed), Hope is almost raped by a photographer, Graham Darros, but she is saved by Nick and Aggie Jones. As high school graduation approaches, she meets Oliver Jones, a DJ who becomes her first serious boyfriend. Instantly, the assertive Steffy takes an interest in Oliver, teasing him in front of Hope for a reaction response. At a Forrester fashion show Pam Douglas tampers with a sign by removing the letters 'p' and 'e' out of Hope's name to create a sign that reads "Ho Logan". Then, at Hope's graduation party (with a mask theme), Brooke has sex with Oliver, claiming she thought it was her husband Ridge behind the mask; this is revealed by a video which Steffy located. It was later revealed the video was tampered by Justin Barber and Liam Cooper, who worked for Spencer Publications – who are against Forrester Creations. Despite unresolved feelings, Hope forgives her mother and tries to recover her relationship with Oliver, until she meets Liam.

Hope meets Liam Cooper, who was soon to be revealed to be the son of Bill Spencer Jr., Hope and Liam forge a friendship but there is something more there which Oliver, her boyfriend, sees whenever they are together. Liam and Hope fall deeply in love. Their love grows despite Oliver trying to win back Hope by making her jealous. Liam and Hope's relationship faces hardship when Amber falls pregnant after supposedly sleeping with Liam, and Liam is thought to be the father. Amber manipulates Liam every chance she gets and causes problems for Liam and Hope. Hope tries to move on, but Steffy encourages her to trust Liam.  The baby is born, and it is quite evident the baby is not Liam's, turns out to be Marcus's baby instead.

Liam and Hope reunite, and he proposes to her. However, she wanted to use this as a way to promote her fashion line, so their wedding was planned for months ahead. Hope tells Liam she wants to wait to consummate their relationship after marriage, Steffy supports the relationship and Liam (who saves her from drowing, when she hits her head after falling in the bath) until she hears so much about the pain Liam is going through. Steffy came to believe that Hope was not right for him and fell in love with Liam. Finally, the night before the wedding (Hope/Liam), Steffy is conned into collecting Liam from his Bachelor Party.  Steffy says goodbye and good luck to Liam and offers a goodbye kiss. After witnessing the kiss, Hope takes off her engagement ring and leaves it at Liam's house. Hope spoke with Liam, by phone and says that she doesn't want to be married, doesn't want to talk and doesn't want to see him again.

Heartbroken and angry, Liam takes the ring and proposes to Steffy, who accepts. Liam and Steffy travel to Aspen, where they are married. Then Thomas set his eyes on Hope.  They shared a kiss despite Hope's unresolved feelings for Liam. Thomas whisks her away to Mexico, for a weekend holiday, without realizing that he is taking Hope to Liam's honeymoon! Thomas proposes to Hope, who says she's not ready and that she still loves Liam, but 'I feel safe with you'. Liam sees Hope and goes after Thomas and Hope on an ATV chase, chasing Hope. Steffy, on her own ATV & goes after Liam and is injured when it all goes wrong. She ends up in the hospital and everyone flies down, and Bill decides to manipulate the situation.  Bill perpetuates a lie about Steffy's health, bribing the doctors to say that her life was at risk, and she must not be upset. Katie finds out about the lie and 'blames' Steffy.    
 
Liam, feeling betrayed by Bill and Steffy, immediately leaves to find Hope. He finds her on the rooftop where he proposed to her and tells her that he loves her and that he wants to be with her to give their relationship a true chance, without manipulations. When they later confront Bill with what they know and what they want from him, Bill refuses to give in, reminding Liam that Steffy is his wife.  Liam, decides to end his marriage with Steffy. mind Despite her pleading, Liam has annulment papers drawn, which Steffy refuses to sign. She offers him a divorce, but not an annulment.  Brooke, arranges for a wedding for Hope and Liam in her home, convinced that her son Rick would seduce Steffy into signing the annulment papers. Steffy refuses, signing 'Sucker' on the paperwork, for Rick.  Fearing that Liam might return to his 'wife', Brooke insists that Hope should have sex with Liam, as the only way to keep him. Hope's first attempt at 'adultery' did not go as well as Hope had wished, and she ended up traumatized. Brooke showed up early the next morning and found Hope in tears. Brooke took Hope to see a sex therapist, for some relaxation medication, to help her with her trauma and so she can be with Liam.

All this accomplishes though is getting Hope hooked on anxiety pills and with the help of Amber, Hope begins to take illegal medication.  When she passes out at the Forrester pool, Liam starts to worry.  Liam is then sent, by Bill, to Aspen, to cover the ski Fashion (winter line), where Steffy is promoting her Forrester Creations Ski Line.  Hope does not trust Liam and Steffy being together in their 'special' place and follows.  On the slopes, Hope is high on her pills and accidentally runs into Steffy, on the slopes. Once again, Steffy is taken to hospital, after Liam finds her on the slopes. Liam is angry that Hope just left Steffy there and did not seek help. When the paramedics arrive, Liam refers to Steffy as his 'wife'. Hope then, confesses to Liam that she is hooked on the pills that she is taking, to allow her to commit adultery (which doesn't sit well for her).  In the hospital, Steffy signs the annulment papers, which she has been carrying with her, but Liam tears them up, deciding instead to proceed with a divorce.

Once the divorce becomes final, Liam and Hope went to Italy at Brooke's insistence to marry. Bill interferes, bringing in Deacon Sharpe, so Hope is late to the wedding and Liam thinking that she had once again walked out on him, turned to Steffy for comfort and asked her to leave with him and marry him again. Hope then arrived at Liam's hotel suite, with Steffy in the bathroom, hearing it all, while Hope told Liam what happened. Steffy insisted that Liam go ahead and marry Hope, so the wedding went off without a hitch. 
Once back in the States, Hope saw a video of Steffy and Liam kissing and falling onto the bed together on 'Hope's wedding day' and refuses to sign papers making their marriage legal in the US.   Hope insists on another wedding. Liam agrees, and Hope plans another wedding at the Forrester Estate, with yet another new designer gown.

The night before the next wedding, Hope and Liam make plans to spend the evening together – a 'date' night, but Stephanie is not well, and Hope decides to stay with her.  Sworn to secrecy, by Stephanie about her illness, Hope phones Liam and cancels their 'date'.    Liam goes straight to where he knows Steffy will be, with her girlfriends and a DJ stint (working).  Liam went off with some people who were unknown to Steffy and returned, drunk and with a red streak in his hair and a removable tattoo.  He went to the roof and fell asleep on a lounger.  Steffy found him there and stayed, on another lounger, waking him, to take him to the wedding venue.   Liam went to have a shower and clean up, for the wedding, but Hope heard Steffy's motorcycle and went to see Liam, before he had a chance to wash it off.  Outraged by Liam's continued reliance on Steffy, Hope calls off the wedding and her relationship with Liam. Thomas and Hope then becomes friends. On the professional front, Hope cancels her line, the wedding line, making a public announcement, that there will be no wedding.

Liam turns again to Steffy, entering a living commitment (Steffy doesn't trust marriage at that time, until she is sure).  Steffy, is called to Paris, by her Father and before she leaves, takes a 'pregnancy test'. Hope, learns that she was lied to, by Rick, about what went on the night before their planned wedding. Hope, hearing that Steffy has just left for Paris (from Rick) races to 'their' (Liam and Steffy's) home, where she walks into their room and begins throwing Steffy's belongings around the room, then grabs Liam and falling on the bed, begins to attempt a seduction.  At that moment, Steffy arrives home, to tell Liam that they are pregnant.  Steffy leaves for Paris, leaving Liam to make up his mind what and who he wants, without knowing about the baby.   Hope makes the most of Steffy's absence, but Liam cannot decide.  He needs time.  When Steffy returns from Paris, she is ready to share her news, but Liam asks Steffy to move out, so that he can decide where his future lies.  Liam sets a date, on which he will finally make his decision.  Steffy remains silent about the pregnancy, because she wants Liam to make up his own mind.  However, the day before Liam is due to 'make his decision', Brooke set up a 'surprise' wedding for Hope and Liam! using Forrester staff.  A staffer calls Steffy and tells her what is going on and all bets are off. 
If Liam is not given the opportunity to make up his own mind, but is being manipulated, then he'll do so, knowing the truth.  Brooke, who has the priest from Italy, ready in a 'surprise', to tell Liam that he can marry him and Hope, phones Liam and asks him to come home. Brooke also calls Hope and asks her to meet at Liam's home. Liam feels trapped, but Brooke, whispers to him and Hope arrives in a white dress, ready for marriage.  Just as he is dithering about actually making the 'commitment', Steffy arrives to tell liam about the baby.   Steffy makes it very clear, that she is happy to co-parent, IF Liam has made the decision to be with Hope, but if he's only doing what Brooke has planned, then he deserves at least to know, before making that commitment.  Liam tells Hope, that he will not leave Steffy, and will not leave a child, who was conceived in love! Hope leaves in tears, surprised by Liam's words and tells her Mother what was said.  Brooke, declares that the only reason he is with Steffy – is because she got herself pregnant – on purpose. 
  
After Steffy is involved in an accident (a car runs a red light), losing her and Liam's child, she learns that she cannot have children. Steffy tells Hope she is leaving and asks Hope to be with Liam, love him and make him happy and give him the Family he so badly wants, without telling Hope or Liam the real issue.

Hope and Liam go to Big Bear Cabin together, to talk. While on a walk, she sees a naked stranger taking a shower. She takes a photo of him, only for him to turn around and see her. She runs away and he chases her. She then falls and is knocked unconscious. The stranger then carries her to safety and when she wakes up, he kisses her. The mysterious stranger turns out to be Wyatt Fuller. After doing some digging, she learns he is the son of Bill Spencer, Jr., therefore the half-brother of Liam. Wyatt and Hope get closer after Liam flies off to see Steffy, at Hope's insistence, asking Steffy why she left the way she did. Steffy rejects him and Liam comes home and proposes to Hope, who accepts. Wyatt moves in with Liam, but when Liam catches him kissing Hope, he punches Wyatt, and after a fight between Bill and Wyatt, Wyatt moves out.  After Hope and Liam have an argument, about him not being able to let go of Steffy, Hope and Wyatt fly to Mexico to get the Hope Diamond for the line, which makes problems for Liam.

Eventually, Hope and Liam get engaged, but when Hope receives a goodbye video Liam made for Steffy, it creates tension between them. Liam, thinking it was Wyatt that sent the video, later finds out it was actually Quinn, and Liam quickly informs Hope. Confronting them both, Hope finds out that Quinn did send the video, but Wyatt had no idea of it until the Hope Diamond reveal. Hope forgives them both. She later ends her engagement to Liam when she is feeling insecure about Liam always turning to Steffy. They soon reconcile, but Hope wants to wait before they get married. Aly Forrester, who has a crush on Liam, sends him a picture of Wyatt and Hope kissing at a photoshoot. Liam decides to confront Hope about her refusal to marry, demands that they do so and that she cut all professional and personal ties with Wyatt and Quinn Artisan Jewelers. Hope chooses Liam over Wyatt and Eric reluctantly agrees to break the contract. Wyatt tries desperately to change Hope's mind but she won't, confessing to her mother that she had never met Liam & fallen in love with him, then Wyatt might have had a chance. On the day of the wedding, Hope goes to see Liam, where he is getting ready for the wedding, in the cabin, but she finds him with Steffy at the cabin. Knowing that Steffy is back from Paris, and guessing she would be back to fight for Liam, Hope decides to rehire Quinn, and she and Wyatt go to Hawaii together. Liam follows soon after to explain to Hope that Steffy had informed him that she is now able to conceive again, and that it was Quinn who once again interfered with their relationship. He then asks her to marry him immediately. Hope declines and ends her relationship with him, finally choosing Wyatt over Liam. Their happiness is short-lived when it is revealed by Liam that Wyatt took the Hope diamond as a P.R stunt, before the real jewel thieves had intentions to steal it. It almost ends their relationship completely, but Hope decides to give Wyatt another chance, much to Liam's dismay. Hope then endures a pregnancy scare, and with Liam's persuasion about making the right decision for her life before getting pregnant or married, Hope decides to date both brothers, agreeing that she will choose who she wants to spend the rest of her life with at the end of it.

Finally, Hope chooses Liam and they become engaged. Quinn unsuccessfully tries to interfere. Wyatt declares his support for Liam and Hope's relationship. Because of this, Liam and Hope decide to rehire Wyatt at Forrester Creations. Wyatt inherits the Hope for the Future Diamond after Ricardo Montemayor dies. He gifts it to Hope, which causes friction between Liam and Hope, and the two brothers. When Liam demands Hope give it back to Wyatt, Hope refuses, and publicly declares at a press conference that she is keeping the diamond. Wyatt and Rick decide to take Hope and the diamond on a promotion tour, starting with a photo shoot in Paris. Hope, finally deciding to make her decision between the brothers, lays an ultimatum, for Liam to meet at the photo shoot, near the Eiffel Tower.  Liam, feeling that he doesn't have time to make it, is planning not to try, but Ivy convinces him to make the effort.   Wyatt begs Hope not to marry Liam, though she insists that she and Liam belong together. Liam misses his deadline with Hope, who then leaves with Wyatt on the Spencer jet. Wyatt takes her to Bill's yacht in Monte Carlo, where Wyatt proposes to Hope using the HFTF diamond, and Hope accepts and marries Wyatt. About a month later, Hope learns, from Liam, that Quinn orchestrated her and Wyatt's marriage by pushing Ivy off the Seine causing Liam to miss her ultimatum.  After confronting Quinn for her role and Wyatt for defending his mother, Hope learned that she was pregnant. Liam and Hope met, privately, where Liam asked Hope, how she could be sure that the child was not his and asked her to leave Wyatt.  Hope said that she 'just knows' that Wyatt is the Father, he is her husband.  Liam then asks Hope to get rid of the baby, or let it be his and to come to him. Hope explains that she doesn't want her child to grow up with multiple fathers and have a complicated relationship like she did. She ended things with Liam for good and told him that she wanted to give her marriage to Wyatt a chance now with the baby on the way. This is all changed when she suffers a miscarriage, because she didn't pay attention to where she was going..   Hope left LA, after telling Liam that she was divorcing Wyatt and was available for him. Hope leaves in tears and visits Brooke in Milan, Italy. Hope does not return to L.A. with Brooke to get over the loss of her child.

In Milan, according to Hope, she 'dated' and had a 'few relationships', but she could not get over Liam.  When Brooke and Ridge married again, Hope was invited home, for the wedding and decided to stay.  She made an agreement with Ridge, to stay out of Steffy's marriage with Liam, and she could work again on her 'label' HFTF.

2018–present 

Hope returns to Los Angeles in January 2018, at Ridge's request, to surprise her mother. She makes her intentions known of returning to Forrester. When Hope meets Sally Spectra, she finds out that Liam and Steffy's marriage is in trouble and so she visits Liam to offer her support and friendship.  Hope learns of Steffy and Bill sleeping together. Hope later starts to fall in love with Liam again.
Bill manipulates Liam to believe that Bill and Steffy are involved; Liam leaves Steffy and their daughter, Kelly, and proposes to Hope. Liam decides to give Steffy another chance for the sake of Kelly, but Hope soon discovers she's pregnant, from the one night she and Liam spent together before their aborted wedding. Steffy catches Liam and Hope making out behind the scenes of the Hope for the Future fashion show, and she breaks up with him; Steffy steps back and gives Liam to Hope because she can no longer be involved in a triangle for Liam's heart, and she needs to do what is best for Kelly. In August 2018, Hope and Liam wed in front of their friends, families, Steffy, and Taylor, and were finally together. They blissfully awaited the birth of their daughter & basked in the happiness they had always longed for.

In January 2019, Hope and Liam are devastated when their infant daughter Elizabeth 'Beth' Avalon Spencer is stillborn. It is revealed that Dr. Reese Buckingham stole Hope and Liam's daughter Beth Spencer and gave them a stillborn baby girl. Reese later brought baby Beth Spencer to his apartment and his friend Flo pretended to be the birth mother. Steffy adopted the baby and named her Phoebe after Steffy's late sister. Hope holds Phoebe for the first time (Beth) and has a connection to her. Steffy then worries about Hope when she starts to get too conformable with Beth. After Steffy takes Kelly and Phoebe to Paris for Hope and Liam to work out their marriage, Hope and Liam's marriage starts to crumble. Hope later meets Wyatt's ex-girlfriend Flo, and learns that she was Phoebe's birth mother and is looking for her biological father. The Logan family learns that Flo is Storm's daughter revealing that Hope and Flo are cousins. Happy, Hope welcomes Flo into their family and in the Forester Company. Thomas Forester (Mathew Atkinson) returns to L.A with devastating news, about Caroline passing away.  Hope then bonds with Douglas, and helps to heal him from losing Caroline.

Afterwards Thomas starts to have an obsession with Hope and manipulates Caroline's death by writing a fake letter saying that Douglas needs a mother and wants Hope to be that mother figure for him. Also uses Douglas to convince Hope to be with his dad. Which lead to Hope and Liam getting an annulment, and wanting to fulfill Caroline's wish. Also, Hope pushes Liam into being with Steffy and wanting him to raise Kelly and Phoebe together. Hope accepts Thomas's proposal. Hope almost had second thoughts about marrying Thomas, until Liam revealed that he and Steffy had sex one night. When Hope and Thomas are married, she still loves Liam, but wants to move forward with Beth being gone. However, Hope feels unconformable with Thomas's advances and not wanting to have sex with him.

When Hope is about to go on her honeymoon with Thomas, Douglas reveals to Hope and Liam that their daughter Beth is alive. Hope believes that Douglas is just confused, and goes on her Honeymoon with Thomas. Their Honeymoon is cut short when Hope still refuses to have sex with Thomas and Thomas receiving a call from Douglas. Thomas and Hope goes back to L.A at Forester's, and Hope locks the office door. Liam storms in the office to tell Hope that Douglas is telling the truth that Beth is alive, and Flo has lied about being Phoebe's birth mother. Hope at first refuses to believe Liam until he reveals to her, that he confronted Flo, and she confirmed that she was never pregnant.

Hope tries to process Liam's information, but Thomas breaks down the door, punches Liam, and grabs Hope to the helicopter. Hope tries to calm him down and asks Thomas to tell her the truth about Beth. Thomas lies to her, and tells her to forget about Beth. Liam sprints and attacks Thomas. After Thomas trying to escape to the helicopter, Liam has him in a headlock and forces Thomas to tell Hope about keeping Beth away from her. When Hope realizing that Thomas could not look her in the eye, she finally realize that Beth is alive. Thomas then punches Liam again and escapes to his helicopter. Hope and Liam cry tears of joy, and Liam says that their daughter was here this whole time, and Steffy had her, but did not know about Phoebe being Beth. Finally, Hope and Liam go over Steffy's house and Hope holds her daughter Beth for the first time, realizing she is alive. When Hope asks how Steffy had their daughter Beth. Liam reveals that he overheard Thomas and Flo arguing at her and Thomas's wedding and Thomas saying that Hope cannot know about a secret.

Liam asks Wyatt to talk to Flo to get her to open up, and Flo accidentally revealed that she never had a baby to Wyatt. After what Douglas had told Liam about Phoebe being Beth, Liam called the hospital in Vegas where Flo supposedly had Phoebe, and it turns out that Flo was never was a patient at the hospital in Vegas, there was no medical records of her being there according to Flo's supposed doctor. Also, Flo revealed to him and Wyatt that Dr. Buckingham owed some people for a gambling debt and needed to pay them, or they would kill his daughter Zoe. Liam goes on reveal that a woman was also Dr. Buckingham's patient lost her baby which was stillborn in Catalina. When Hope passed out after giving birth to Beth, he switch the babies. Hope learns that she held the unknown woman's stillborn baby, believing that Beth was dead. Liam says that Taylor told Reese that Steffy was looking to adopt a sister for Kelly and Reese told that there was a woman who is willing to adopt, in which Flo comes in. Liam explains to Hope that Dr. Buckingham and Flo knew each other from Vegas and he needed her to pose as the birth mother to "Phoebe". Liam then tells Hope that Taylor did not know about Phoebe being Beth and that she gave Dr. Buckingham a lot money in cash for their daughter. In shocked and crying, Hope asks Liam who else knew about Beth. Liam says that Zoe knew but did not want her dad to get arrested, Xander Avant, and Emma Barber.

However, Liam reveals that Emma found out when Zoe and Xander was arguing and was on her way to tell Hope the truth before she died. Finally, Liam warns Hope that Thomas knew about Beth around the time they got an annulment and that he was chasing Emma crashed her car in a ditch because she was texting while driving. Hope apologizes to Liam, and vows to leave Thomas for his deceit. When Steffy returns Hope and Liam tells her about Flo not being Phoebe's birth mother and that Phoebe is Beth. Hope and Steffy argue about Beth and that Steffy still wants to keep her, but realizes that Hope was robbed of being Beth's mother and decides to give Beth back to Hope and Liam, much to Steffy's sadness. Afterwards Hope and Liam go to the cabin and Douglas arrives. Hope lets Douglas knows that she is happy that she has her daughter back, and that she thanks him for telling the truth. Also, she tells Douglas that she will still take care of him.

Hope and Liam have a celebration on having Beth back with their family. While going back to the cabin Flo is there. After putting Beth down, Hope confront Flo about her betrayal, and tells her that she would never forgive her for keeping her daughter away from her for months. Hope and Liam talks with Justin about reversing the adoption and to serve Thomas annulment papers for his deceit. Hope later contacts Thomas to confront him on keeping Beth away from her, manipulating her grief, and using Douglas and announces that they are getting a divorce. When Hope is getting the rest of Beth's things from Steffy's house, Thomas shows up and wants to convince her to not end their marriage. Hope does not want to hear him, and tries to leave but Thomas grabs her. Hope breaks free and runs outside but Thomas tries to tell her that if he would had told the truth she would leave him for Liam. Hope tries to get out of his grip to tell him that it is over between them. Brooke arrives to the Steffy's house gets Hope out of Thomas grips. When Thomas tries to apologize, Brooke pushes him out of the way and Thomas falls over the cliff.

At the hospital Hope angrily wants Thomas to wake up so that he can face the consequences of his action, Thomas then awakens. Thomas tells Detective Sanchez that his fall was an accident in front of Brooke, Ridge, Liam, and Hope. Also, he apologizes to Hope for lying to her and hopes she can forgive him. Hope, Liam, and Beth are at the cabin, and Hope tells Liam that she will never forgive Thomas for keeping Beth away from them, and believes that he only told Detective Sanchez that Brooke pushed him by accident in hopes to get back in her good graces. Liam tells her that they still got a lot of time with Beth, and to only worry about the present.

References

External links 
 Hope Logan profile – Soapcentral.com

The Bold and the Beautiful characters
Television characters introduced in 2002
Female characters in television
Logan family